The 1977–78 Segunda División B was the first season of Segunda División B, the third highest level of the Spanish football league system. The league was made up of last 4 teams from 1976-77 Segunda División and 2nd to 10th teams from 1976-77 Tercera División. In concept, the Segunda División B was identical to the old Tercera Division, which was now reduced to two divisions. First and 2nd in each group were promoted to Segunda División, and the bottom three were relegated to the Tercera División.

Group 1

A total of 20 teams will contest the group, including 1 relegated from the Segunda División and 19 promoted from the Tercera División.

Promotion and relegation
Teams relegated from 1976–77 Segunda División
 Pontevedra CF
Teams promoted from 1976–77 Tercera División
 Racing de Ferrol, Castilla CF, CD Orense, CD Mirandés, Bilbao Athletic, Cultural Leonesa, UP Langreo, AD Torrejón, Real Unión, Atlético Madrileño, SD Huesca, Palencia CF, CD Ensidesa, CD Pegaso, Caudal Deportivo, Sestao Sport, SD Compostela, CD Tudelano and CD Basconia.

Teams
Teams from Aragon, Asturias, Basque Provinces, Galicia, León, Navarre, New Castile and Old Castile.

League table

Results

Top goalscorers

Top goalkeepers

Group 2

A total of 20 teams will contest the group, including 3 relegated from the Segunda División and 17 promoted from the Tercera División.

Promotion and relegation
Teams relegated from 1976–77 Segunda División
 Levante UD, Barcelona Atlético and CD San Andrés.
Teams promoted from 1976–77 Tercera División
 AD Almería, Algeciras CF, AD Ceuta, Gerona CF, Xerez CD, CD Olímpico, CD Diter Zafra, Racing Portuense, Vinaroz CF, Sevilla Atlético, Linares CF, CD Badajoz, UD Lérida, Onteniente CF, RCD Mallorca, CD Eldense and Atlético Baleares.

Teams
Teams from Andalusia, Balearic Islands, Catalonia, Extremadura and Valencia.

League table

Results

Top goalscorers

Top goalkeepers

External links
 RFEF Site

Segunda División B seasons
3
Spain